Roger Cuche (27 October 1928 – 10 April 1999) was a Swiss boxer. He competed in the men's lightweight event at the 1952 Summer Olympics.

References

External links

1928 births
1999 deaths
Swiss male boxers
Olympic boxers of Switzerland
Boxers at the 1952 Summer Olympics
Lightweight boxers